Buckfield is a town in Oxford County, Maine, United States. Buckfield is included in the Lewiston-Auburn, Maine metropolitan New England City and Town Area. It is a member of  Regional School Unit 10 along with nearby Hartford and Sumner.  The town had a population of 1,983 as of the 2020 census.

History

It was first settled in 1776 by Benjamin Spaulding from Chelmsford, Massachusetts, a fur trapper. Abijah Buck and Thomas Allen settled in the area in spring of 1777 with their families. In 1785, the inhabitants procured a survey of the town and  purchased it from  Massachusetts for 2 shillings per acre. Originally called Bucktown Plantation (or Plantation No. 5), in 1793 the Massachusetts General Court incorporated it as Buckfield, named for Abijah Buck.

The surface of the town is uneven, but has deep, dark soil that yielded good crops of grain, corn and apples. The east and west branches of the Nezinscot River join at Buckfield Village, supplying water power for mills. Products included lumber, roof shingles, barrel staves, box boards, shovel handles, snow-shovels, handsleds, drag-rakes, brushes, brush blocks, powder-kegs, leather harness, cutting-blocks and men's boots. In 1870, the population of the town was 1,494. The Rumford Falls and Buckfield Railroad passed through the town. Its depot was at Buckfield Village, the business center for the area.

Geography

Buckfield is drained by the Nezinscot River, a tributary of the Androscoggin River.

The town is crossed by state routes 117 and 140. It borders the towns of Sumner and Hartford to the north, Turner to the east, Hebron to the south, and Paris to the west and West Paris to the northwest.

Demographics

2010 census

As of the census of 2010, there were 2,009 people, 821 households, and 547 families living in the town. The racial makeup of the town was 97.7% White, 0.2% African American, 0.3% Native American, 0.4% Asian, 0.1% from other races, and 1.3% from two or more races. Hispanic or Latino of any race were 0.5% of the population.

There were 821 households, of which 29.6% had children under the age of 18 living with them, 51.0% were married couples living together, 10.0% had a female householder with no husband present, 5.6% had a male householder with no wife present, and 33.4% were non-families. 25.0% of all households were made up of individuals, and 8.2% had someone living alone who was 65 years of age or older. The average household size was 2.45 and the average family size was 2.88.

The median age in the town was 41.2 years. 23.2% of residents were under the age of 18; 7% were between the ages of 18 and 24; 25.1% were from 25 to 44; 32.9% were from 45 to 64; and 11.9% were 65 years of age or older. The gender makeup of the town was 51.0% male and 49.0% female.

2000 census

As of the census of 2000, there were 1,723 people, 668 households, and 476 families living in the town. There were 715 housing units at an average density of 19.0 per square mile (7.3/km2). The racial makeup of the town was 100% [98.49% White, 0.17% Native American, 0.35% Asian, 0.12% from other races, and 0.87% from two or more races. Hispanic or Latino of any race were 0.41% of the population.

There were 668 households, out of which 35.3% had children under the age of 18 living with them, 58.5% were married couples living together, 9.0% had a female householder with no husband present, and 28.7% were non-families. 20.2% of all households were made up of individuals, and 6.7% had someone living alone who was 65 years of age or older.  The average household size was 2.58 and the average family size was 2.99.

In the town, the population was spread out, with 26.8% under the age of 18, 7.5% from 18 to 24, 30.9% from 25 to 44, 25.0% from 45 to 64, and 9.9% who were 65 years of age or older.  The median age was 37 years. For every 100 females there were 96.5 males.

The median income for a household in the town was $36,821, and the median income for a family was $40,078. Males had a median income of $28,472 versus $22,262 for females. The per capita income for the town was $17,503.  About 5.6% of families and 8.3% of the population were below the poverty line, including 9.5% of those under age 18 and 9.9% of those age 65 or over.

Voter registration

Landmarks

Churchill Bridge – built  1797
E.C. and M.I. Record Homestead – built 1843–1844
Enoch Hall House – built  1790
Union Church – built in 1832
Zadoc Long Free Library – built in 1901

Schools

 Buckfield Junior-Senior High School

Notable people

Gallery

References

External links

 Town of Buckfield
 Maine.gov – Buckfield, Maine
 School Administrative District 39

Towns in Oxford County, Maine